Collonges-au-Mont-d'Or is a commune in the Metropolis of Lyon, Auvergne-Rhône-Alpes region, eastern France.

It is the site of L'Auberge du Pont de Collonges, the restaurant of chef Paul Bocuse.

References

Communes of Lyon Metropolis
Lyonnais